"Give My Life" is a song written by Alexander Bard and Tim Norell from Norell Oson Bard and Jean-Pierre Barda. It was recorded by the Army of Lovers, their first single after the return of La Camilla Henemark to the group, scoring a 1995-1996 hit. The single charted for 18 weeks in Sweden and 23 weeks in the Netherlands. The song also charted at Trackslistan in Sweden.

Single track listing
12" maxi-single (Sweden, 1995)
Give My Life (Sound Factory Mix) - 6:36
Give My Life (Love Society Mix) - 5:28
Give My Life (Temple Of Doom Mix) - 8:41
Give My Life (Radio Edit) - 3:54

12" maxi-single (UK, 1995)
Give My Life (Flexifinger's Five Gates Of Hell Mix) - 6:24
Give My Life (Temple Of Doom Mix) - 8:41
Crucified (Candygirls Remix) - 8:07

CD-Single
Give My Life (Radio Edit) - 3:54
Stand Up For Myself (The 1995 Remix) - 3:59

CD-Maxi (UK, 1995)
Give My Life (Radio Edit) - 3:54
Give My Life (Flexifinger's Five Gates Of Hell Mix) - 6:24
Crucified (Candygirls Remix) - 8:07

Charts

Weekly charts

Year-end charts

References

1995 singles
Army of Lovers songs
English-language Swedish songs
Songs written by Alexander Bard
1995 songs
Songs written by Tim Norell